Cyrillic Extended-B is a Unicode block containing Cyrillic characters for writing Old Cyrillic and Old Abkhazian, and combining numeric signs.

Block

History
The following Unicode-related documents record the purpose and process of defining specific characters in the Cyrillic Extended-B block:

References 

Unicode blocks